Hyaleucerea uniformis is a moth of the subfamily Arctiinae. It was described by Rothschild in 1912.

References

Euchromiina
Moths described in 1912